Raymond "Ray" Cazaux (3 July 1917 – 11 September 1999) was an English freestyle sport wrestler, born in Liverpool, who competed for Great Britain in the 1936 Summer Olympics and in the 1948 Summer Olympics. In 1936 he competed in the freestyle bantamweight tournament. Twelve years later he finished fifth in the freestyle bantamweight competition at the 1948 Olympics. At the 1938 Empire Games he won the bronze medal in the freestyle bantamweight class.

References
Ray Cazaux's profile at Sports Reference.com

1917 births
1999 deaths
Sportspeople from Liverpool
Olympic wrestlers of Great Britain
Wrestlers at the 1936 Summer Olympics
Wrestlers at the 1948 Summer Olympics
British male sport wrestlers
Wrestlers at the 1938 British Empire Games
Commonwealth Games bronze medallists for England
Commonwealth Games medallists in wrestling
Medallists at the 1938 British Empire Games